The Punjab Legislative Assembly is the unicameral legislature of the Indian state of Punjab.

The seat of the Legislative Assembly is at Chandigarh, the capital of the state. The term of the Legislative Assembly is five years, unless dissolved earlier. Presently, it comprises 117 members who are directly elected from single-seat constituencies.

34 of the constituencies are reserved for Scheduled Castes.

History
Elections were held on 4 February 2017,  20 February 2022.

Map

List of constituencies

See also
 15th Punjab Assembly

References 

 
Punjab
Constituencies